USS Montrose (APA/LPA-212) was a  in service with the United States Navy from 1944 to 1946 and from 1950 to 1969. She was scrapped in 1970.

History
Montrose was of the VC2-S-AP5 Victory ship design type and was named for Montrose County, Colorado. She was laid down 17 June 1944, under Maritime Commission (MARCOM) contract, MCV hull 560, by Permanente Metals Corporation, Yard No. 2, Richmond, California; launched 13 September 1944; sponsored by Mrs. Marcia C. Barnhart; and commissioned 2 November 1944.

World War II
After shakedown off California, Montrose embarked troops at Seattle, Washington, and steamed to the Philippines, arriving at Leyte 21 February, to prepare for the invasion of the Okinawa.

Invasion of Okinawa

Montrose participated in the landings in Kerama Retto 26 March, and on 2 April, shot down two kamikazes. She steamed to Menna-shima off Okinawa 15 April, and disembarked units of the 306th Field Artillery. Four days later she took part in a diversionary feint on the southwest tip of Okinawa, returning to Menna Shima 23 April. Leaving the Ryukus she sailed to Ulithi with Army casualties, en route to San Francisco to embark more troops. She debarked these units at Manila 27 July.

For the next 2 months she shuttled troops between the Philippines and Hawaii. From 25 August to 24 October, Montrose was busy carrying occupation troops to Sasebo, Kyūshū.

Decommissioning
She was decommissioned on 26 October 1946, and was assigned to the Pacific Reserve Fleet at Stockton, California.

Korean War
After hostilities broke out in Korea, Montrose recommissioned 12 September 1950, and arrived Yokosuka, Japan, 8 January 1951, to help repel the invasion by North Korea. She took troops to Inchon early in 1951; and, in April, after a run to Hong Kong, she steamed for the California coast. She returned to Yokosuka 30 July 1952, and joined TF 90, supporting operations off Korea, until returning to San Diego 6 December 1952.

Peacetime operations
She returned to Japan in March 1954 and took part in training exercises from Iwo Jima to Korea.

Operation Passage to Freedom
When war threatened in Indochina, she sailed to Saigon. Leaving Saigon 9 August, she proceeded to Haiphong to evacuate refugees from there to Saigon as part of Operation Passage to Freedom. By 12 September, Montrose had evacuated 9,060 people. She sailed home, arriving San Diego 21 November.

Transport and training missions
In March 1955, Montrose travelled again to Japan, disembarking members of the 3rd Marine Division. Between April and November, she helped train South Korean amphibious forces and operated off the Japanese coast, until steaming to San Diego in November. She spent the early part of 1956 in training, before proceeding to the Far East for operations in the Bay of Siam in October. She arrived San Diego 13 April 1957, and operated off the California coast for the next 5 months.

In September, she took part in cold weather landing exercises near Kodiak, Alaska, then remained on the west coast until 12 June, when she sailed for Japan. Between 1958 and 1965, she operated off the California coast, and made several voyages to the Far East.

Vietnam War
During the summer of 1965, Montrose visited San Francisco, Puget Sound, and Hawaii as part of the Pacific Midshipman Training Squadron. With the situation in South Vietnam becoming more precarious, Montrose left San Diego 23 August 1965, to begin training off Okinawa. In November, she conducted several successful strikes against the Vietcong, the first attack coming at Lang Keaa. The following month she participated in a massive attack on the Vietcong near Da Nang. She sailed 25 January 1966 for Cù Lao Ré, and assisted in an attack on a Vietcong stronghold there.

She arrived 14 April, at San Diego, and returned for her 12th deployment in the western Pacific early in 1967. She anchored at the mouth of Lòng Tàu River, South Vietnam, on 23 March, and took part in the establishment of a powerful riverine force. While delivering supplies at Đông Hà 25 May, Montrose came under hostile fire. She arrived 16 September 1968, at San Diego, and began preparation for a return trip to the western Paciflc into 1969.

Final decommissioning
Montrose was decommissioned and struck from the Naval register on 2 November 1969. The Navy returned permanent custody to the Maritime Administration (MARAD), 4 June 1970, who immediately sold her for scrapping to Zidell Corporation, Portland, Oregon, the same day for $100,343.43. She was transferred out of the Bremerton Navy Yard on 10 June 1970.

Awards
Montrose received one battle star for World War II service, three for Korean War service and six for Vietnam War service, giving her a career total of ten battle stars.

Memorial
The ship's bell and a display about the vessel can be seen in the city of Montrose.  Because the radio callsign of the Montrose  was NPPP, the occasional amateur radio event commemorating this vessel uses the callsign N0P.

Notes 

Citations

Bibliography 

Online resources

External links

 

Haskell-class attack transports
Montrose County, Colorado
World War II amphibious warfare vessels of the United States
Troop ships
Ships built in Richmond, California
1944 ships
Pacific Reserve Fleet, Stockton Group